Lopadea may refer to one of two places in Alba County, Romania:

Lopadea Nouă, a commune
Lopadea Veche, a village in Mirăslău Commune